Hoël II (c. 1031–1084) was Count of Kernev (French: Cornouaille, Breton: Kernev), from 1058 as Hoël V. On the basis of his marriage to Hawise, Duchess of Brittany, in 1066, he became Duke of Brittany jure uxoris.

Life
Hoël was the son of Alain Count of Cornouaille and his wife, Judith of Nantes, granddaughter of the illegitimate son of Alan II of Brittany. Hoël started the House of Kernev (Cornouaille) of Brittany, which ruled the Duchy until 1156.

Hoël became Count of Nantes in 1054. The title came to him through his mother's family. Matthew I of Nantes, Count of Nantes until his death in 1050, was the nephew of Hoël's mother, Judith of Nantes, the son of her only brother Budic of Nantes. Alain Canhiart seize the County in the name of his son Hoël in 1050, and held it as Regent for his son until 1054.

Conan II, Duke of Brittany, attempted to seize Nantes in 1054 but was defeated. Hoël ruled the County of Nantes in his mother's name from this date until Judith's death in 1063. From 1063 onward he was Count of Nantes in his own right.

Conan II, Duke of Brittany, died childless in December of 1066 and the duchy passed to his sister Hawise, Hoël's wife. Hawise became Duchess of Brittany and as her husband, Hoël became Duke of Brittany jure uxoris. Hawise died in 1072 and Hoël acted as regent for his son, Alan IV, until 1084.

Little is known of the lives of Hawise and Hoël. However, this political marriage between the House of Rennes in the east and the House of Cornouaille in the west may have further strengthened Brittany at a time when external interference was attempted by William the Conqueror. 

During his reign Hoël faced several rebellions from Breton nobles. Geoffrey Grenonat of Rennes (an illegitimate son of Duke Alan III of Brittany and half-brother of Hawise) led a revolt and was joined by Ralph de Gael who had returned to Brittany from England after the failure of the previous year's Revolt of the Earls. In 1076, Ralph having plotted against Hoël, was besieged at Dol. William the Conqueror came to Hoël's aid, after which Hoël finally made peace with Ralph.

Marriage and children
Hoël and Hawise had: 
 Alan IV, succeeded to the duchy of Brittany
 Matthew, succeeded to the county of Nantes.

Notes

References

Bibliography

1030s births
1084 deaths
11th-century dukes of Brittany
11th-century viceregal rulers
Dukes of Brittany
Regents of Brittany
Jure uxoris officeholders